Colaspis favosa is a species of leaf beetle from North America. It is found mostly along the Gulf and Atlantic coasts of the United States; its range spans from Texas to Georgia and to New York.

References

Further reading

 

Eumolpinae
Articles created by Qbugbot
Beetles described in 1824
Taxa named by Thomas Say
Beetles of the United States